Chickasabogue Park is an  park in Eight Mile, Mobile County, Alabama. It is linked via Chickasabogue Creek to the town of Chickasaw and Mobile Bay. The park also contains a museum featuring Native American, Colonial, and plantation-era artifacts, housed in a former African Methodist Episcopal church built in 1879.

History
The earliest known inhabitants of the park were Woodland period Native Americans around 1500 BCE.  Jean-Baptiste Le Moyne de Bienville, founder of Mobile, relocated Apalache tribe members along Chickasabogue Creek.  The first European settlement came in 1787, when Spaniard Don Diego Miguel Álvarez was granted land there.  Frederic Daniel Myers and his sons built a saw mill along the creek as early as 1843.  The plantation came to encompass a grist mill, a brick kiln, rice, corn, and livestock fields, and a town which contained a public school.  In the final months of the Civil War, around 700 residents of Whistler hid in the area to escape advancing Union troops.  The area was used as a recreation area as early as the 1930s.  The Myers family sold the property in 1903.  The land was later purchased by Scott Paper Company, who donated the original  to the county in 1969.

References

External links

Parks in Alabama
Protected areas of Mobile County, Alabama
Hiking trails in Alabama
Bike paths in Alabama
Mountain biking venues in Alabama